Lucius Owen Kelly (June 18, 1858 – July 11, 1932) was a farmer and political figure on Prince Edward Island, Canada. He represented 3rd Queens in the Legislative Assembly of Prince Edward Island from 1886 to 1890 as a Conservative.

He was born in Fort Augustus, Prince Edward Island, the son of Francis Kelly and Sarah McCarron, and was educated at Prince of Wales College and at a business college in Charlottetown. Kelly was defeated when he ran for reelection in 1890. He also served as a commissioner of the peace. Kelly moved to Boston later in life and died there at the age of 74.

References 
 

Progressive Conservative Party of Prince Edward Island MLAs
1858 births
1932 deaths